Sons of Butcher is a Canadian adult animated Comedy television series based on the band of the same name. It is animated using a variety of programs, put together using Adobe Flash.

Premise
The show follows the exploits of Sol Butcher, Ricky Butcher, and Doug Borski, who operate a successful butcher shop called "Sons of Butcher Quality Meats" in the slums of Steeltown, a city modelled after Hamilton, Ontario. When not tending to the shop, they play together at various venues in a Rock band, naturally called "Sons of Butcher".

It was announced on April 28, 2007 that Teletoon opted not to renew Sons of Butcher for a third season. On sonsofbutcher.com they declared that they'd be stopping entirely and their "guitars will be unplugged indefinitely".

A petition was started to renew the show for another season, taking donations from fans.

Main characters

Solsolido Ron "Sol" Butcher
Sol is the current owner of the butcher shop, older brother to Ricky, and the eldest and strongest of the three. He inherited the shop from their father, Arpo Butcher, who died in an unfortunate accident involving a meat grinder. Sol is a recovering alcoholic, and is unable to drink even a small amount of non-alcoholic liquor without going on a massive drinking binge that causes him to grow a thick beard in an instant and run through the city streets wearing nothing but a green thong. Despite his gruff attitude, Sol is the friendliest of the trio, affectionately referring to anyone he likes as "buds"; he only seems to have a short temper around Ricky, who often shows a rebellious attitude towards his authority as an older sibling.

Sol writes songs for the band sometimes and has a habit of speaking in malapropisms. Sol's stupidity has had some consequences, as in one episode Sol (mistaking both the point and spelling of I.O.U.s) inadvertently becomes an infamous robber in Steeltown. Sol has had a few romantic interests in the series, including a woman named Sherry (whom he had literally dreamed about) and Jaco's daughter Suncheeps (whom he broke up with upon discovering she snored monstrously when she slept). He has gone to extreme lengths to earn their affections, including stealing massive amounts of coal in the hopes of making them into diamonds, and encasing himself in a feta cheese sculpture of Aphrodite to gain Jaco's respect. Despite owning the butcher shop, Sol has worked in a few other jobs over the series, such as a prison chef (while incarcerated), cruise ship worker, and small-time actor.

Sol apparently has a name for each of his nuts; one is named Terry and the other one Berry.

Rickence Raine Ronnie R. "Ricky" Butcher
Ricky is Sol's clinically obese younger brother. He seems to suffer from several eating disorders that raise his gluttony to the point that he will eat anything, despite the fact that this has made him suffer through multiple heart attacks and even a tapeworm (which he deliberately gave himself by eating many rotten fish in an attempt to lose weight quickly). While he often considers himself to be a ladies' man, he seems to have a thing for women who are either grossly overweight or considerably older than he is, sometimes to the point of being middle aged and having one or more children (which Ricky hates) and maybe even already having a husband. It was originally Ricky's idea to start the band, after finding his deceased father's old guitar in a box of his belongings. He is quite talented and creative with a guitar, often coming up with new songs and constantly trying to defend his self-proclaimed status of "rock god." He is usually the lead singer (Doug and Sol have been known to sing sometimes) and is constantly criticizing the other two for not being able to keep up with him; because of this, he seems to long for a solo deal when he finally gets signed onto a label, which he perpetually believes will happen very soon.

Although Ricky technically works at the butcher shop, he actually does very little work, and happily abandons his post there every time a better opportunity comes up. He has, in such cases found other work as a police officer/vigilante, steel worker, and a member of the frequently changing in tone band Feedbag. Ricky is violent and confrontational, but clearly makes a poor physical combatant, once receiving a bloody hole in his chest from Jaco, and being physically overpowered by three old women until thrashing blindly at them (all while wearing protective foam body armor).

Ricky dyes his hair later on in the series, explaining why his hair is a different color of that of his brother or father.

Dougland Peyronie "Doug" Borski
Doug is the 18-year-old janitor of the Sons of Butcher meat shop, hired by late proprietor Arpo Butcher. He was raised in Africa by a tribe of aborigines, and his adoptive parents were devoured by a 5-legged lion moments after revealing they weren't his real parents. After Doug failed his rite of manhood firewalk, the tribe banished him to Canada, where he found a job as a janitor. Doug has a vast collection of pornography and is obsessed with cleaning any and all filth.

Doug is often heard speaking in Ebonics because of his upbringing, sometimes to the point where he becomes difficult to understand. Doug has worked in several other jobs throughout the series, both alongside and in place of his janitorial duties. Among these professions have been carnie, janitor at a different carnival, cruise ship worker (along with Sol and Ricky), bodyguard, and impromptu butcher. A running gag in the first season involves Doug being hired for a new job in the middle of introducing himself, his new employer never caring to hear his name before giving him a job.

Doug is also addicted to pornography; he is seen many times playing with himself while watching these kind of magazines and not paying attention to anything else (even to a point when a girl hits on him and he's too absorbed in the magazines to notice). At some point, he tries to leave pornography behind and start to date real women, but he accidentally ends up working in adult cinema. It is revealed in the final episode of season 2 that Doug is color blind.

Arpo Butcher
Sol and Ricky's late father, killed in a meat grinding accident. Much like his eldest son, he was a heavy drinker as well, and frequently abused and insulted the boys when they were young (according to recurring flashbacks seen in the show), even developing the pet names "shithead" for Sol and "dorknuts" for Ricky. The current status and whereabouts of their mother is unknown.

Arpo's spirit briefly returns once to possess a haunted house that Sol has created for Halloween, wherein he chastised Sol for not making it scary enough. He currently resides in hell, and his face is never shown (in its place is a Jack-o-lantern that moves its lips and eyes as if it were his actual face).

In one of Sol's flashbacks, it is shown that his dad used to towel whip him for not being able to pee in public, which in turn traumatized Sol up to his adult life making him "pee shy."  Arpo's body is seen as being considerably overweight, and he has a long beard.

Recurring characters

Jean-Guy
A muscle bound French-Canadian man who occasionally appears as a friend to the Butchers. He first appears as a carnival ride operator, using marijuana smoke to enhance the experience. On one occasion, Jean-Guy gives Ricky steroids to improve his physical condition, but Ricky quickly abandons them when he discovers that they've massively shrunk his testicles. It was Jean-Guy who forced Sol to try to overcome his pee shyness by peeing in a public urinal at a rock concert.

Good Cop
A black person wearing a white shirt and gray slacks, always with the bad cop; his punch line is what my partner is trying to say is...

Bad Cop / Digs
A white, muscular man with long brown hair, always punching people, which then is followed by the Good Cop's punch line. He wears a red shirt. He is briefly referred to as "Digs."

Guest stars

 Rudy Ray Moore (Dolemite) makes an appearance in Season 2 as Rudy the psychic janitor.
 Pat Mastroianni appears as Parsons, the womanizing metrosexual stud.
 Jeff Wincott appears as Ram Punchington, the martial arts action star, and a character that was based on Jeff Wincott himself.
 Karl DiPelino appears as Karl, the production assistant.

Episodes

Series overview

Season 1 (2005)

Season 2 (2006–07)

Song listing
Not all songs listed below have been released. However, all have been featured at some point in an episode of the Sons of Butcher animated series.

"SOB Theme"
"SOB Story"
"The Gentle Art of Butchery 2"
"Tit Song"
"Cheeseburgs"
"Becomin' a Butcher"
"Helpin' the Community"
"Hate Triangle"
"Tapeworm"
"'Nsane Dream"
"Tenderize Me"
"Bacon Shakes"
"Epiphany in the Key of Bigfoot"
"The Gentle Art (Original)"
"Escape Ants"
"Lick Me Up"
"Low Carb Treat"
"Butcher of the Month" aka "Ode to my Brother"
"In the Cellar"
"Salon Tech"
"Rum Cruise"
"S'verybody Someone"
"Prayers for Fishies"
"Bigfoot Rap"
"Bacon Shakes (Reprise)"
"New Wave Them"
"Arpo's House of Death"
"Chicken Fever"
"Come Fight Me"
"Crazy Toenails"
"Dear John"
"Dirtbike"

"Don't Egg Me"
"Feed The Snake"
"Fukt Country"
"Funky Drummer Carol"
"Go Vegan"
"Heavy Duty (Look At That)"
"How Will Doug Die?"
"I Kill Everything"
"Jaco: Portrait of a Kicked Ass"
"Why Must I Bleed"
"My Cow Son"
"Pineapple Breaks"
"Playin' High"
"Publicity Rocket 3.0"
"Publicity Rocket 4.0"
"Punch You With A Knife"
"Rashmen"
"Rock Rash"
"Scalpin' Interrogation"
"Scalpin'"
"Slaughterhouse Blues"
"The Lord VS Rock"
"The Message"
"The Plan"
"Trainin' Jerry"
"Trainin' The Robot"
"Until It Bleeds"
"Until It Rains"
"Warehouse Party"
"Wolfback Laceration"
"Workin' the Line"
"Decapitation"

"Love in the Raw"
"Cherry Thief"
"(Dream) Girl Dream (Lady)"
"Fuck the Shit"
"In Thru The Outhole"
"I Hate Girlfriends"
"Pump Me Up"
"Punch That Face"
"Rockload"
"We Fuckin' Rule"
"Prayers"
"Meatlantis"
"Action Reaction"
"Here To Rock"
"Party's On"
"Love Blaster"
"Made Love By The River"
"I Need An Arm"
"Whip’em Out"
"F The World"
"Fuck Producers"
"Panty Dropper"
"Doug In Space"
"Suite: Bad Touch"
"Free Shit"
"Ultimate Drinking Song"
"Sneakin’ in"
"Razors"
"Meatlantis Reprise"
"Gold"
"Loverechaun"
"Lion Tech"

References

External links
 Fuck The Shit Music Video
 

2000s Canadian adult animated television series
2000s Canadian music television series
2000s Canadian satirical television series
2000s Canadian sketch comedy television series
2005 Canadian television series debuts
2007 Canadian television series endings
Canadian adult animated comedy television series
Canadian adult animated musical television series
Canadian flash animated television series
English-language television shows
Teletoon original programming
Television series by S&S Productions